Rin Kaihō or Lin Haifeng (born May 6, 1942) is a professional Taiwanese Go player who made his name in Japan. He is, along with Cho Chikun, Kobayashi Koichi, Otake Hideo, Takemiya Masaki and Kato Masao, considered one of the 'Six Supers' that dominated Japanese Go world in the last three decades of the twentieth century.

Biography
Rin Kaiho was born in Shanghai, China. He was a student of Go Seigen when Go brought him to Japan in 1952. He was a promising player who won his first title at the age of 23, the Meijin. He is also part of the 1200 win group. Rin's rise to fame came in 1965 when he challenged Sakata Eio for his Meijin title. Rin, at the time, was still only 23 and critics thought he would stand no chance against the then powerful Sakata. Even Sakata himself said that no Go player under the age of thirty should be Meijin. However, Rin put up a great fight and won the Meijin title. Rin would continue winning the Meijin on different occasions, along with the Honinbo, during the late 1960s and early 1970s. His number of titles currently is 34, ranking him 7th of all time on the total number of titles list, tied with Norimoto Yoda. Rin has been on a dry spell of titles lately, with the last time he even challenged for one being in 2001, for the Meijin. Rin became the first professional in Nihon Ki-in history to reach 1,300 career wins. He won the game against Nobuaki Anzai on October 19, 2006 in a preliminary match for the 32nd Kisei. Rin currently resides in Tokyo, Japan, but remains a citizen of Taiwan.

Promotion record

Titles and runners-up
Ranks #8-t in total number of titles in Japan.

Trivia
Rin is Honorary Tengen.
He needs to win the Kisei tournament and he will have won all 7 major Japanese titles.
In 1968 he became the second player to hold the Meijin and Honinbo titles at the same time.
Starting in 1964, Rin had entered the Meijin League and remained in the league (including being the Meijin title holder) for 35 consecutive years (39 participation in total), which is a historical record for all Go tournaments in Japan.
In 2007 Lee Changho mentioned to the media that Rin is his most respected professional Go player for his respectable personality.
His students are Cho U, Rin Kanketsu, and Rin Shien.

External links
GoBase Profile
Sensei's Library Profile

Bibliography

References 

Japanese Go players
Taiwanese Go players
Go (game) writers
Japanese people of Taiwanese descent
1942 births
Living people
Go players from Shanghai
Taiwanese expatriates in Japan
Recipients of the Medal with Purple Ribbon
Taiwanese people from Shanghai